Marmanet is a town in Kenya's Laikipia County. It is situated approximately 15 kilometres north of Nyahururu on the Nyahururu-Rumuruti Road., and is home to Marmanet Farcmers Co-operative Society, which is one of the largest and oldest farmer's co-operatives in Kenya

References 

Populated places in Rift Valley Province